"Heartbreak Anthem" is a song by Swedish electronic music duo Galantis, French DJ and music producer David Guetta and British girl group Little Mix. An EDM and pop track with dance-pop influences, it was released on 20 May 2021 through Atlantic Records. The single was co-written by Guetta, Galantis member Christian Karlsson, alongside Perrie Edwards, Leigh-Anne Pinnock, and Jade Thirlwall.

The recording stages for "Heartbreak Anthem" took place before the coronavirus pandemic, and between London, Los Angeles and Stockholm. Described as an uplifting break up track with lyrics that are about moving on amicably after the end of a relationship. The original recording featured vocals from Jesy Nelson, however the vocal arrangement was redone following her departure from the group in 2020. A music video was filmed and released during Perrie Edwards and Leigh-Anne Pinnock's pregnancies, that shares inspiration from Angela Carter's 1984 famed magical realism novel Nights at the Circus.

"Heartbreak Anthem" received positive reviews from music critics, with praise being drawn to its uplifting good vibe and group vocals. A commercial success, the song peaked at number one on Hungary's radio chart. On the UK Singles Chart, it peaked at number three becoming Galantis' highest charting entry on the charts there. The song also reached the top ten in Ireland, Lebanon, and Poland, and charted in 20 other countries. "Heartbreak Anthem" was nominated for "Best International Song" at the 42nd Brit Awards and "Dance Song Of The Year" at 2022 iHeartRadio Music Awards. The group performed the song for the first time as a trio on The Confetti Tour.

Background and release 
Galantis, David Guetta, and Little Mix began work on "Heartbreak Anthem" before the coronavirus pandemic. The song originally featured vocals from Little Mix member Jesy Nelson, but the vocal arrangement was changed after her departure from the group in December 2020.

On 14 May 2021, the song was teased by all three artists by posting a link to a website that displayed a 24-hour timer. On 14 May, after the timer finished "Heartbreak Anthem" was announced through all three artists' social media. 

 The song appears on Little Mix's greatest hits album Between Us.

Critical reception 
Writing for Vulture, Zoe Haylock wrote that "Heartbreak Anthem" is "far from a sad song, but something about listening to a dance track when there's actually a possibility of dancing soon is emotional". DJ Times Brian Bonavoglia stated the collaboration as an "uplifting sing-a-long that is impossible not to fall in love with". Euphoria Magazine complemented the song as an "absolute dance-pop banger" and "free-spirited". Katie Bain from Billboard wrote that "the song's production is built from brightly plucky strings and synth, with the lyrics – in the grand tradition of Destiny's Child's "Survivor" – focused on being better than that: not holding grudges, understanding that while sometimes it works out, sometimes it doesn't, and that while maybe we'll fix this, it's also possible we won't. Whatever! Who cares!" From ThatGrapeJuice, Sam Ajilore applauded the music video and stating the song is "rich in summer smash potential".

From Official Charts, Rob said "The whole thing eventually builds into a frothy and ridiculously bouncy affair laced with Galantis’ signature string-flecked EDM flourishes and Guetta's dependable dance pop production." Attitude ranked the song as the group's best dance collaboration.

Accolades

!
|-
|rowspan="2"|2022
| Brit Awards
| Best International Song
|
|style="text-align:center;"|
|-
|iHeartRadio Music Awards
|Dance Song of the Year
|
|
|}

Commercial performance
Heartbreak Anthem topped the Mediabase US dance radio, UK Official Big Top 40, UK Dance Singles and Hungary's radio charts. In the United Kngdom the song debuted at number nine, becoming Galantis' fourth, Guetta's 24th and Little Mix's 17th top 10 single. For the week ending 4 June 2021, it reached a new peak of number eight and in the same week, the title track of Little Mix's sixth studio album, Confetti (2020), charted at number nine. This marked, the first time the group had two songs in the top ten on the UK Singles Chart since 2016, when the group's singles "Touch" and "Shout Out to My Ex" were at numbers four and six.  It later reached a new peak of number three on the UK Singles Chart during its seventh week charting, becoming Galantis' highest charting single there. That same week, the song was certified silver by the British Phonographic Industry (BPI) in the United Kingdom for selling 200,000 units in the country. In its tenth week on the UK Singles "Heartbreak Anthem" remained inside the top ten at number seven, making Little Mix the first girl group to spend a total of 100 weeks in the top ten of the UK Singles Chart. 

It was ranked as the fourth-biggest song from June to August 2021 in the UK. According to The Official Charts, by the end of 2021 "Heartbreak Anthem" was ranked as the nineteenth best selling single of 2021 and the 27th most streamed song overall. It was also the seventh most played track of the year on UK radio.

In Ireland, the song debuted within the top 20 on the Official Irish Singles Chart, and became the Little Mix 22nd Top 20 single on the chart. It later reached a new peak of number three on the chart, giving Little Mix their 11th Top 10 single there. It also reached the top ten in New Zealand, Poland, Lebanon and the Euro Digital Songs, and US Dance/Electronic Songs charts.

Elsewhere, "Heartbreak Anthem" reached the charts in 21 other music markets including Australia, where the song debuted at number 100 on the ARIA Singles Chart for the chart dated 31 May 2021. In its seventh week, it reached a new peak of number 46, becoming their highest charting single there since "Woman Like Me" in 2018.

Year-end lists

Music video 

Little Mix teased the music video for "Heartbreak Anthem" by posting behind-the-scene photos from the video, one day before the official release of the song. The music video for the song, directed by Samuel Douek, was released alongside the song on 20 May 2021. The video features Little Mix members, Perrie Edwards, Leigh-Anne Pinnock, and Jade Thirlwall, in a theatre production. The video opens up with the group dressed as winged angels, each having a microphone accompanying them.

Douek said in an Instagram post that "The concept of the music video is inspired by Angela Carter's infamous 1984 novel Nights at the Circus, a magical realism feminist tale about freedom". He added that the group portrayed "The Winged Fatales", an all singing, all dancing trio who perform night after night to adoring crowds, whilst backstage they feel trapped and alone. The video also features digital images of David Guetta and the Galantis. Douek also stated that "The video touches upon the pressures of fame and heartbreak, evoking a message of self-acceptance against the backdrop of a sci-fi burlesque world". The video for the song currently has 40 million views on YouTube.

Track listing

Personnel 
 Galantis – production, backing vocals
 Christian Karlsson – mixing
 David Guetta – production, backing vocals
 Little Mix – vocals 
 David "Saint" Fleur – co-production, mixing, programming, keyboards
 Henrik Jonback – co-production
 Johnny Goldstein – co-production
 Thom Bridges – co-production
 Mike Hawkins – co-production
 Sondr – co-production
 Toby Green – co-production
 Randy Merrill – mastering
 Serban Ghenea – mixing
 Raphaella – recording, vocal production

Charts

Weekly charts

Year-end charts

Certifications

Release history

See also
 List of UK top-ten singles in 2021
 List of top 10 singles in 2021 (Ireland)
List of UK Dance Singles Chart number ones of 2021

References

External links
 
 

2021 singles
Atlantic Records singles
David Guetta songs
Galantis songs
Little Mix songs
Electronic dance music songs
Songs about heartache
Song recordings produced by David Guetta
Song recordings produced by Henrik Jonback
Songs written by Christian Karlsson (DJ)
Songs written by David Guetta
Songs written by Henrik Jonback
Songs written by Jenna Andrews
Songs written by Sorana (singer)